Asad Khani (also Romanized as Asad Khānī and Asad Khāneh; also known as Kartūl) is a village in Shirvan Rural District, in the Central District of Borujerd County, Lorestan Province, Iran. At the 2006 census, its population was 690, in 181 families.

References 

Towns and villages in Borujerd County